Rhode Island schools

Note: The schools of Providence County, Rhode Island, USA also have a separate table: Providence County, Rhode Island schools

High schools
See also :Category:High schools in Rhode Island

Middle and junior high schools

Elementary schools

Private schools and Other Schools